Cosymbiini is a tribe of the geometer moth family (Geometridae), with about 515 species in 11 genera, and 5 genera with 170 species tentatively associated with the tribe.

Genera
Anisephyra Warren, 1896
Bytharia Walker, 1865
Chlorerythra Warren, 1895
Chrysocraspeda Swinhoe, 1893
Cyclophora Hubner, 1822 (including Anisodes Guenée, 1858)
Mesotrophe Hampson, 1893
Perixera Meyrick, 1886
Pleuroprucha Moschler, 1890
Pseudosterrha Warren, 1888
Ptomophyle Prout, 1932
Zeugma Walker, 1862

Uncertain association
Hemipterodes Warren, 1906
Lipotaxia Prout, 1918
Prasinochrysa Warren, 1900
Semaeopus Herrich-Schaffer, 1855
Trygodes Guenee, 1857

References

 
Moth tribes